Come Back to Me is a 1944 German film directed by Heinz Paul and starring Charlott Daudert, Natasa Gollová and Margarete Haagen.

Cast
 Charlott Daudert
 Natasa Gollová
 Margarete Haagen
 O.E. Hasse
 Victor Janson
 Albert Matterstock
 Marina von Ditmar
 Gustav Waldau

References

Bibliography 
 Ulrich J. Klaus. Deutsche Tonfilme: Jahrgang 1944. Klaus-Archiv, 2006.

External links 
 

1944 films
1940s German-language films
Films directed by Heinz Paul
Films of Nazi Germany
German black-and-white films
1940s German films